UJC might refer to:

 Urban Justice Center, New York City, US
 United Jewish Communities, US
 Unión de Jóvenes Comunistas, Cuban political youth organisation
 Union de la jeunesse congolaise, a Congolese youth organisation
 União dos Jovens Comunistas, formerly the youth wing of the Portuguese Communist Party
 United Jihad Council
 United Jupiter Company, fictional corporation from 2022 video game “The Callisto Protocol”